Pseudogekko smaragdinus (or  green smooth-scaled gecko,  Polillo false gecko or emerald false gekko) is a species of gecko, which is one of the many types of lizard. It is endemic to the Philippines, where it is listed by the IUCN as "least concern," presumably because populations are currently stable; this gecko is fairly common in the forests of Polillo Island, however, it is quite difficult to find in most other areas.

References 

Pseudogekko
Reptiles described in 1922
Taxa named by Edward Harrison Taylor
Reptiles of the Philippines